Djemila Benhabib (born 1972) is a Canadian journalist, writer, and politician who lives in Bruxelles, Belgium. She is of Algerian and Greek-Cypriot descent, and is known for her opposition to Islam.

Biography 

She was born in Ukraine in 1972, but grew up in Algeria. Her father is Algerian and her mother Greek Cypriot.

She was a finalist for the 2009 Governor General's Literary Awards for her non-fiction book Ma vie à contre-Coran: une femme témoigne sur les islamistes. Her second book is Les soldats d'Allah à l'assaut de l'Occident.

In 2010, she appeared on the Jean-Marie Colombani invite show on Public Sénat, the television channel of the French Senate.

In 2012, she received Le Prix international de la laïcité.

She was the Parti Québécois candidate for Trois-Rivières in the 2012 Quebec general election, but narrowly failed to defeat the sitting member, Danielle St-Amand.

She was again candidate in 2014, this time in Mille-Îles, but was defeated by Liberal candidate Francine Charbonneau.

References

1972 births
Canadian non-fiction writers
Algerian women writers
Algerian writers
Algerian people of Greek Cypriot descent
Canadian women non-fiction writers
Living people
Place of birth missing (living people)
Parti Québécois candidates in Quebec provincial elections
Canadian people of Algerian descent
Canadian people of Greek Cypriot descent
Canadian secularists
Former Muslim critics of Islam
Canadian critics of Islam